Brighton is an unincorporated community located within Andover Township and Green Township in Sussex County, New Jersey, United States.

In 1872, it was noted that Brighton had a small number of houses.

References

Andover Township, New Jersey
Unincorporated communities in Sussex County, New Jersey
Unincorporated communities in New Jersey